João de Matos (May 30, 1955 – November 4, 2017) was an Angolan military general. He led the Angolan force during the Second Congo War to support Joseph Kabila's regime. He died of pancreatic cancer in Spain in 2017.

References

1955 births
2017 deaths
Angolan military personnel
Deaths from cancer in Spain
 deaths from pancreatic cancer